Keradere tengstroemiella is a species of snout moth. It is found in Greece, North Macedonia, Turkey, Turkestan and Russia.

The wingspan is 15–17 mm.

References

Moths described in 1874
Phycitini
Moths of Europe
Moths of Asia